Ouèssè  is a town, arrondissement, and commune in the Collines Department of central Benin.The commune covers an area of 3200 square kilometres and as of 2013 had a population of 141,760 people.

References

Communes of Benin
Populated places in the Collines Department